Delta Bluff is a steep triangular rock bluff immediately north of the mouth of Delta Glacier, on the west side of Skelton Glacier. It was surveyed and climbed in 1957 by the New Zealand party of the Commonwealth Trans-Antarctic Expedition (1956–58) and so named because of the shape of the bluff.

References

Cliffs of the Ross Dependency
Hillary Coast